The International HCH and Pesticides Association (IHPA) was founded in July 1998 with the aim of facilitating and promoting international cooperation and the exchange of experiences within management of pollution problems stemming from the production and use of HCH and other unwanted pesticides worldwide. Since September 2002, the IHPA has been officially registered as a Foundation in The Netherlands.

The IHPA supports the work towards sustainable solutions in production and application of pesticides and promotes international cooperation of all parties involved in the field of pesticides.

External links 
 International HCH and Pesticides Association

International organisations based in the Netherlands
International trade associations